Oriental région or Oujda region is one of the twelve regions of Morocco, located in the north-eastern part of the country. It covers an area of 90,127 km² and has a population of 2,314,346 (2014 census) and is the easternmost region of Morocco.

The capital and the largest city is Oujda, and the second largest city is Nador. The region includes 7 provinces and one prefecture. 

A majority of the population of Oriental speak Moroccan Arabic (86.2%) as a first or second language. A large minority speak the Rif-Berber language (38.4%) as a first language. Small numbers speak Eastern Middle Atlas Tamazight and Figuig Tamazight, principally in the south of Oriental.

Etymology
The English name Oriental is derived from the French term L'Oriental (for "the east") and comes directly from the Latin orientalis, "of the east", being that the region is located in the east of Morocco. The Arabic name Ash-Sharq also means "the east", as does the Berber name Tagmuḍant (from agmuḍan).

Geography
Oriental is situated in the northeastern part of the country, with a northern coastline on the Mediterranean Sea. The region of Tangier-Tetouan-Al Hoceima, lie to its northwest, Fès-Meknès to its west, Drâa-Tafilalet to the southwest, with the Algerian provinces of Tlemcen and Naâma to its east and Béchar to the south. Melilla, a Spanish autonomous city, also borders the region. In 2015, Oriental was expanded to include Guercif Province.

The region is made up into the following prefectures and provinces:
	

 Berkane Province
 Driouch Province
 Figuig Province
 Guercif Province
 Jerada Province
 Nador Province
 Oujda-Angad Prefecture
 Taourirt Province

Municipalities by population (2014)

History

Administration

Notable Personalities from the Oriental Region

Arts & Cinema
Hafid Bouazza – Writer
Hamid Bouchnak – Moroccan raï singer and songwriter
Nathalie Delon – Actress and director
Douzi – Singer and songwriter
Les Freres Megri – Rock band very popular in the Arab world, composers and producers.
Philippe Faucon – Filmmaker
Fouad Laroui – Writer and economist
Michel Qissi – Actor
Mimoun El Oujdi – Raï singer
Younes Megri – Actor, singer author of 'Leli Touil' sung by Maria de Rossi & Boney M.
Abdelkrim Derkaoui – Cinematographer, film director and screenwriter
Bassouar Al Maghnaoui – Singer
Cheikh Mohamed Salah Chaabane – Musician Gharnati Music
Simon Basinger – Musicologist, essayist, producer and author
Charlotte Slovack – Filmmaker
Douzi – Pop singer
Serge Guirao – Singer
Bayane Belayachi – Singer
Elwalid Mimoun – Artist
Khalid izri – Artist
Namika – Musician

Sports
Hakim Ziyech – International Footballer, Semi Final World Cup 2022
Adil Belgaid – Olympic judo fighter (3 times World Champion, 6 times African Champion, 3 times Arab Champion, 3 times Olympian)
Achraf Ouchen – professional karateka
Abdelatif Benazzi – Rugby player
Philippe Casado – Cyclist
Selim Amallah – Football player
Abdelkarim Kissi – Footballer
Soufiane Kourdou – Professional basketball player
Moha Rharsalla – Footballer
Mohammed Qissi – Actor (Kickboxer, Bloodsport with Jean Claude Vandamme)
Mohcin Cheaouri – Track and Field Athlete, 2 times African champion
Yahya Berrabah – Olympic Athlete, African champion in Long Jump
Daniel Sanchez – Footballer
Gilles Simon – Formula 1
Ahmed Belkedroussi – Football manager
Khadfi Rharsallah – Footballer
Marianne Agulhon – Slalom Canoeist
Mohammed Berrabeh – International footballer
Hassan Alla – Footballer
Mohammed Ben Brahim – Footballer
Khalid Chalqi – Footballer
Gerard Soler – Footballer midfielder
Khalid Lebji – Footballer midfielder
Abou El Kacem Hadji – Footballer
Ryad El Alami – Footballer
Abdelah Kafifi – Footballer
Mohamed Atmani – Boxer (Summer Olympics)
Soufiane Kourdou – Basketball player
Houssam Amaanan – Footballer
Habib Allah Dahmani – Footballer
Abdelkader El Brazi – Former international goalkeeper
Aziz Bouhaddouz – International footballer
Fouzi Lekjaa – Football administrator and businessman
Hicham El Guerrouj – Former Olympic athlete, world record holder for the fastest mile also the current world record holder in the 1500m and 2000m
Mohammed Hendouf – Moroccan-Belgian kickboxer

Politics & Diplomats
Ahmed Osman – Former Prime Minister, married King Hassan II's sister, Lalla Nuzha of Morocco
Zoulikha Nasri – Advisor to King Mohammed IV, MD of foundation 'Mohammed V for Solidarity'
Muhammad Ben Abdessalam Al Muqri – Late 19th senior official, advisor and grand vizier to several sultans
Abdelkader Lecheheb – Football player and Ambassador to Russia
Mohamed Allal Sinaceur – Former Minister of Cultural Affairs
Jamal Benomar – Politician
Ahmed Aboutaleb – Politician
Mohamed Habib Sinaceur – Politician
Ahmed Toufiq Hejira – Former Minister of Housing and Urbanism
Kaddour El Ouartassi – Historian
Najima Rhozali – Politician, professor
Yvette Katan Bensamoun – Historian
Omar Benjelloun – Journalist
Abdelaziz Bouteflika – (1937–2021), 5th President of Algeria
Abdelnour Abbrous – Politician
Chakib Khelil – Politician
Hassnae Bouazza – Journalist, writer, columnist
Louisette Ighilariz – Politician
Najat Vallaud-Belkacem – Politician
Germain Ayache – Historian

Other
Abdelrazzak Hifti – 2022 World Cup team doctor
Maurice Levy – French businessman, Chairman of Publicis Group

References

External links
 Oriental web portal in French
 Oujda entry in lexicorient
 Figuig in English, French and Arab